USS Chinaberry (AN-61/YN-82) was a  which served the U.S. Navy during World War II. Chinaberry operated in both the Atlantic Ocean and the Pacific Ocean before being decommissioned at war's end.

Built in Maine
Chinaberry (AN-61) was launched 19 July 1943 by Snow Shipyards, Inc., Rockland, Maine, as YN-82; reclassified AN-61 and named Chinaberry 20 January 1944; and commissioned 12 March 1944.

World War II service

Atlantic Ocean Theatre operations
Chinaberry sailed from New York City 24 June 1944 in a convoy bound for Belfast, Northern Ireland, arriving 10 July. She operated as net tender in European waters, principally off the coast of France until 12 December, when she cleared Plymouth, England in convoy for Charleston, South Carolina, arriving 6 February 1945. After overhaul she sailed 26 March for Narragansett Bay to conduct experimental net operations and to train pre-commissioning crews for net tenders.

Pacific Ocean operations
From New York City, Chinaberry sailed 11 May in convoy for the Panama Canal Zone, continuing independently for San Diego, California, San Francisco, and Pearl Harbor, arriving 28 June.
 
Between 19 July 1945 and 5 November, Chinaberry tended nets at Eniwetok.

Post-war decommissioning
On 5 December, she arrived at San Pedro, California, Chinaberry was decommissioned 26 March 1946 at Mare Island, California, and sold 27 February 1950.

References 
 
 NavSource Online: Service Ship Photo Archive - YN-82 / AN-61 Chinaberry

 

Ailanthus-class net laying ships of the United States Navy
Ships built in Rockland, Maine
1943 ships
World War II net laying ships of the United States